may refer to:

Places
 Iruma, Saitama, a city in Japan
 Iruma District, Saitama, a district in Japan
 Iruma River
 Iruma Air Base

Peoples
 , a Japanese writer and light novel author

Characters

 , protagonist in the manga and anime Welcome to Demon School! Iruma-kun
 , a character from the Danganronpa video game and anime series